Kṛṣṇadāsa Kavirāja Gosvāmī (born 1496; date of death unknown) was the author of the Caitanyacaritāmṛta, a biography on the life of the mystic and saint Caitanya Mahāprabhu (1486–1533), who is considered by the Gaudiya Vaishnava school of Hinduism to be an incarnation of Rādhā and Kṛṣṇa combined.

Early life

There is scant information about the life of Krishna Dasa Kaviraja Goswami. Krishna Dasa was born in 1496 CE in the village of Jhamatpur, within the district of Bardhaman,  West Bengal. He claimed his descent from cowherds (Gopas). His father was called Bhagiratha, and his mother was named Sunanda. He also had a younger brother named Shyamananda Dasa. Both his parents died when he was young, thus he and his brother were raised by relatives.

Instructions
Krishna Dasa relates in his Chaitanya Charitamrita that, once his brother argued with a prominent Vaishnava devotee Minaketana Ramadasa over the ontological positions of Chaitanya and Nityananda (Chaitanya's lifelong companion) and belittled the position of Nityananda. Krishna Dasa considered this to be an unpardonable offence and rejected his brother forthwith.

After receiving instructions in a vision from Nityananda, Krishna Dasa left Bengal and travelled to Vrindavana where he took initiation from Raghunatha Dasa Goswami (1494–1586 CE), one of the direct followers of Chaitanya Mahaprabhu

Chaitanya Charitamrita
At an advanced age and in poor health Krishna Dasa commenced work on his magnum-opus the Chaitanya Charitamrita (c. 1557) after being repeatedly petitioned by the devotees in Vrindavana who had never met Chaitanya and who were eager for details. He vividly describes in the text itself: “I have now become too old and disturbed by invalidity. While writing, my hands tremble. I cannot remember anything, nor can I see or hear properly. Still I write, and this is a great wonder.”

In composing his Charitamrita, Krishna Dasa used the diaries of Murari Gupta and Swarupa Damodara, both of whom were intimate associates of Chaitanya. Krishna Dasa was given a great deal of information by his guru, Raghunatha Dasa also, who had served Swarupa Damodara when the latter was Chaitanya's personal secretary.

Due to its amount of detail on the life of Chaitanya and his precepts, the Chaitanya-charitamrita became the definitive biography of Chaitanya Mahaprabhu.

According to the Gaura-ganoddesha-dipika of Kavi Karnapura, Krishna Dasa Kaviraja has been identified as being an incarnation of the handmaiden of Krishna called Kasturi Manjari.

Works
He wrote some short prayers in Sanskrit as well as Chaitanya Charitamrita and two other major works:

 Chaitanya Charitamrita — The most definitive biography of Chaitanya Mahaprabhu.
 Sri Govinda-lilamrita — A work explaining the daily pastimes of Krishna and his associates in Vrindavana.
 Saranga-rangada kangada tika — A commentary on the Krishna-karnamrita of Bilvamangala Thakura.

See also
Gaudiya Vaishnavism
Hare Krishna
Chaitanya Mahaprabhu
Nityananda Rama

Bibliography
 Tirtha, Swami B.B., Sri Caitanya and His Associates, 2001, Mandala Publishing, San Francisco, .
 Gaudiya Vaisnava Abhidhana (Bengali), Compiled by Haridasa Dasa, Haribol Kutir, Navadvipa, W.Bengal, 1957.
 Bhakti-ratnakara (Bengali), Narahari Chakravarti, Pub. By Gaudiya Mission, Kolkata, 1986.

References

External links
 

Gaudiya religious leaders
People from Mathura
Bengali Hindus
16th-century Bengalis
Bengali writers
Hindu writers
1496 births
Year of death unknown
People from West Bengal
Vaishnava saints
16th-century Indian writers
Writers from West Bengal
Indian biographers